Manuel Gonçalves Cerejeira, GCC, GCSE, GCIH (29 November 1888, Lousado, Vila Nova de Famalicão, Portugal – 2 August 1977, Buraca, Amadora, Portugal) was a Portuguese cardinal who served as Patriarch of Lisbon from 1929 to 1971. He was the last surviving cardinal elevated by Pope Pius XI, and his cardinalate of forty-eight years was the longest since the fifty-eight-year cardinalate of Henry Benedict Mary Clement Stuart of York which lasted from 1747 to 1805. He took part in three conclaves: in 1939, 1958 and 1963. Although there were seven other cardinals elevated by Pius XI who participated in the 1963 conclave, Cerejeira was the longest-serving living cardinal from the death of Jozef-Ernest van Roey on 6 August 1961 until his own death almost exactly sixteen years later.

Family
Cerejeira was the eldest of three sons and four daughters of Avelino Gonçalves Cerejeira (1857 – 1927), a merchant from Lugar da Serra, and his wife, Joaquina Gonçalves Rebelo (1864 – 1918). His mother had resided at the Parish of Lousado since her childhood and became a country woman (i.e., a peasant woman) upon marriage. Manuel's younger brothers were Júlio (b. 1901), a medical doctor, Joaquim, a lawyer, and António, a university employee. One of his younger sisters was a nun and one was called Carolina.

Early life
He was educated at the seminary in Braga from a young age and became a priest in 1911. Following his ordination, he became a faculty member of the University of Coimbra, during which time he became a respected and revered intellectual and religious figure. He also met António de Oliveira Salazar and the two later became leading figures in the Centro Académico de Democracia Cristã (Academic Centre for Christian Democracy), which supported the Catholic Church's social doctrine.

Career

In 1928, Cerejeira became a bishop and was elevated to the patriarchate of Lisbon the following year, at the age of forty-one. He replaced António Mendes Belo, who had experienced two very different periods during his twenty-year cardinalate: a time of anti-church hostility in the first years of the Portuguese republic and a more church-friendly climate following the military coup of 1926. Cerejeira was appointed cardinal a month after his appointment as patriarch. At the time of his elevation, he became the youngest member of the College of Cardinals. The closest approach was made by António Ribeiro, his successor as Patriarch of Lisbon, who was made a cardinal in 1973, three months before his forty-fifth birthday.

During his extraordinarily long career as Portugal's leading Catholic churchman, Cerejeira often became associated with the authoritarian right-wing Estado Novo. This was the result of his friendship with Prime Minister António de Oliveira Salazar, who had been a university colleague of his at Coimbra, and his endorsement of many of the Estado Novo's policies. He signed the Concordat of 1940 between Portugal and the Catholic Church. However, although he was considered a conservative, he accepted the Vatican Council II reforms more readily than Salazar. He was criticized for not being more vocal on his support of the Bishop of Porto, António Ferreira Gomes, who was forced to a 10 years exile after having written a critical letter to the Portuguese dictator.

On January 1, 1971, he lost the right to participate in a conclave, having already reached age 80.

Honours
 Grand-Cross of the Order of Christ, Portugal (March 5, 1932)
 Grand-Cross of the Order of Saint James of the Sword, Portugal (May 14, 1936)
 Grand-Cross of the Order of Prince Henry, Portugal (December 27, 1960)

Notes and references

Bibliography
  [collection, on centenary of birth of Cerejaira]

Cardinals created by Pope Pius XI
Participants in the Second Vatican Council
20th-century Portuguese cardinals
1888 births
1977 deaths
People from Vila Nova de Famalicão
Archbishops of Lisbon